Edward the Black Prince is a 1750 historical play by the British writer William Shirley. Written in the style of Shakespeare, it portrays the life of Edward the Black Prince an English leader in the Hundred Years War and father of Richard II.

The original Drury Lane cast included David Garrick as Edward, Spranger Barry as Lord Ribemont, Edward Berry as Cardinal Perigot, John Sowdon as King John, William Havard as Arnold, Richard Winstone as Charney, Thomas King as Duke of Athens and John Palmer as Audley.

References

Bibliography
 Nicoll, Allardyce. A History of Early Eighteenth Century Drama: 1700-1750. CUP Archive, 1927.

1750 plays
British plays
Plays about English royalty
Cultural depictions of princes
Edward the Black Prince
Plays set in the 14th century
Plays set in England
West End plays